The Bristol 401 saloon and Bristol 402 cabriolet are British luxury sporting cars, produced between 1948 and 1953 by Bristol Cars, an offshoot of the Bristol Aeroplane Co. They were developed from the Bristol 400, which continued in production alongside the 401 and 402 until 1950.

Although mechanically the 401 and 402 used an improved version of the BMW M328 hemi-head engine and its unusual arrangement of two separate pushrods to operate the exhaust valves (necessitated by the hemispherical combustion chambers and opposite facing valves) used in the 400, the styling was a huge advance on the pre-war bodies of that first Bristol model. It was inspired by the Milanese designer, Carrozzeria Touring, and its most notable feature was that the door handles were not exposed and to open the doors the owner pressed a button into a groove in the door. The body also was more spacious than the 400 and was a full five-seater.

At the front the 401 and 402 were also quite distinctive with their headlights moved quite a distance into the centre of the body on either side of the narrow grille, which resembled BMW a little less than did the 400. They were also deeply curved at the front: this, along with the then-unique door handle arrangement, is believed to give the 401 a drag coefficient of less than Cd 0.36 – competitive even by today's standards and remarkable for the time.

The suspension is independent at the front using a transverse leaf spring and wishbones and the rigid axle at the rear uses torsion bars. Steering is by rack and pinion. The brakes are Lockheed hydraulic with  inch drums all round.

Although the 401's production figure of 611 is still the largest of any Bristol model, the 402 is regarded as one of the rarest classics among cars of its day. In a recent survey, 13 of the 23 produced could be accounted for.

The test car cost £3532 including taxes. Referring that road test in a subsequent 'classic car'  feature, the journal summarised the 401 as a "Medium-sized car offering very high standards of comfort and performance".

401 Farina Cabriolet

Four examples of a 401 Cabriolet with styling by Pininfarina were also produced.

References

External links

 Bristol Owners Club – Bristol Type 401 – 2 litre Saloon
 Bristol Owners Club – Bristol Type 402 – 2 litre Drophead Coupe

Bristol 401
401
Sports sedans
Convertibles
Cars introduced in 1948
Rear-wheel-drive vehicles